My Kitchen Rules is an American competitive cooking reality show, based on the original Australian format of the same name. The eight-episode series premiered on January 12, 2017 and is produced by 7 Beyond and broadcast on the Fox network.

The program sees teams of two take turns hosting a dinner party at their home, attempting to impress their fellow competitors as well as professional judges Curtis Stone and Cat Cora. Teams with the lowest score after each round are eliminated.

In 2012, US-based production company Kinetic Content acquired the format rights for an American version of the show during the MIPTV Media Market event in Cannes, France, however that series never eventuated.

Teams
Unlike the original Australian format of the program, the American adaptation involved celebrity competitors.

Ratings

References

External links

My Kitchen Rules
2017 American television series debuts
2017 American television series endings
2010s American cooking television series
English-language television shows
American television series based on Australian television series
Television series by Beyond Television Productions
Fox Broadcasting Company original programming
Cooking competitions in the United States
Food reality television series